First Westroads Bank is a locally owned community bank in Omaha, Nebraska, United States, with two branches. First Westroads Bank provides personal and business banking services, as well as investment services through First Westroads Investment Centre, a division of the bank. The bank has received a 5-star rating from Bauer Financial for the past 87 consecutive quarters.

History 

First Westroads Bank was chartered in 1967 as an independent, suburban, commercial bank with a state license.  The new bank occupied space in the developing Westroads Shopping Center.

The original location was in a trailer located in the south mall parking lot, but was moved indoors to the home office of "270 Italia Mall" in the spring of 1968.
In addition to the indoor location, there was also a drive-thru, television-controlled facility located in the south parking lot which was connected by a tunnel and tube carrier system, later converted to a manual drive-in, walk-in facility in 1973.
 
A second three-lane, drive-up location was opened in the NBC Center area at 10855 West Dodge in January 1977, which has since been known as the "Old Mill" headquarters location.

In 1979 the bank was sold to United Bancshares of Nebraska, Inc., a one bank holding company, where it would remain until 1990 when it was purchased by Ameriwest, a holding company owned by current bank owners, Chris and Betsy Murphy.

After a short period of temporary building, parking lot and trailer locations, the Westroads Mall Branch made its permanent home in the new building at 612 N. 98th Street in 2002. The corporate headquarters location remained in the Old Mill area until March 2005 when it re-located to its current home, 15750 West Dodge Road.
 
First Westroads Bank is active in the Omaha community, and is a Project PAYBAC partner for Aldrich Elementary School and Kiewit Middle School in Millard Public Schools.

Financial Performance 

First Westroads Bank has been named a Top Performing Community Bank by the American Bankers Association Banking Journal, based on its earnings, asset quality, and capital. The bank has also received a 5-star financial strength rating by independent bank rating institution Bauer Financial for the past 87 consecutive quarters, as of March 2016.

Executive Board 

As of 2022, the executive board includes:

 Chris J. Murphy, Chairman & CEO, First Westroads Bank
 Mark Ellerbeck, President & Chief Lending Officer, First Westroads Bank
 John M. Blazek, President, JMB Capital, LLC
 Michael E. Leighton, Retired President & CEO Retired, Omaha Community Foundation
 Daniel J. Murphy, Director of Marketing/IT, First Westroads Bank
 Thomas K. Nichting, Managing Director, Red Diamond Capitol
 Stephen F. Robinson, Retired President, First Westroads Bank
 Gary K. Witt, Shareholder, Consulting Director, Lutz & Company
 John Nahas, President, Corporate Management Consulting

Bank Officers

As of 2022, the bank officers are the following:

See also

 Economics of Omaha

References

External links
 

 Omaha Magazine
 First Westroads Bank - Bloomberg Business

Banks based in Omaha, Nebraska
Banks established in 1967
1967 establishments in Nebraska